Rorty is a surname. Notable people with the surname include:

 Amélie Rorty (born 1932), Belgian-born American philosopher
 James Rorty (1890–1973), American radical writer and poet, father of Richard Rorty
 Malcolm C. Rorty (1875–1937), American economist
 Richard Rorty (1931–2007), American philosopher